PS Emmylou is a paddle steamer operated by Murray River Paddlesteamers in Echuca, used for both day and overnight accommodation cruises.

History

Built in 1980 and named after the country singer Emmylou Harris, the PS Emmylou has been host to thousands of people, delighting even her namesake during the late 1980s. 
Alongside the PS Pevensey, the PS Emmylou starred in the TV series All the Rivers Run, in which she was renamed the PS Providence.

Built in an effort to pay tribute to the steam powered vessels of the Murray before her, the Emmylou began life as three lengths of steel in a shed at Barham, in 1980. Designed by naval architect Warwick Hood, and Glenn Davis, the boat's characteristics were loosely based on the hull of the PS Pyap, the engine-room of the PS Melbourne, the main deck-house of the PS Pevensey and the PS Industry, and the wheel-house of the PS Adelaide. Following a three-month search expedition, a 1906 Marshall, Sons & Co. portable steam engine was located in a shed at the old Moulamein Timber Mill. The Emmylou was the first steam-driven overnight paddle steamer to be launched since the PS Ruby's maiden voyage in 1907.

When launched in 1982 by owner Anthony Bowell, the PS Emmylou could comfortably accommodate 16 overnight passengers in twin stacked berth cabins (that included basins) and offered shared showers and bathrooms. She boasted modern features, such as two sundecks, "full stereo sound system, television, VHS video tape, air-conditioning, taped movies, and some games".

By 1984, the PS Emmylou was under new ownership and had been refurbished to include an additional two cabins, enabling her to host up to 20 overnight passengers.

Cabins of the PS Emmylou

Modern day

The PS Emmylou, like The Pride of the Murray and PS Canberra, operates as a tourist attraction in Echuca operated by Murray River Paddlesteamers. It is one of the most recognisable and iconic Paddlesteamers in Australia. The Emmylou is now the only wood fired paddlesteamer in the world offering regular scheduled accommodated river cruises.

The Emmylou was relaunched in September 2018 following a $500,000 renovation, becoming Australia's most luxurious boutique inland river cruiser when her cabins were refitted to a luxury standard with ensuites; including the new premier 'Emmylou Suite'. Guests are offered the opportunity to step back in time and let the Emmylou connect them to Australian history, geography, culture and cuisine. Passengers on accommodated cruises enjoy riverside campfires, BBQ's, winery visits, world heritage wetlands and cultural experience, all whilst enjoying the sights and sounds of Australia's most famous river.

The Emmylou also operates on select weekends to undertake normal sightseeing, lunch, and dinner cruises, and is also available for weddings, corporate functions and private events subject to availability. When available, Redgums on the PS Emmylou offer a 3 course luncheon with a selection of mains and deserts, while the Evening Steaming offers a 5 course dinner including three selection of main, while accompanied by a 3-hour cruise.

Particulars
The PS Emmylou is powered by a restored 1906 wood-fired Marshall, Sons & Co. 2-cylinder double acting horizontal steam engine, which was dismantled, restored and modified prior to installation. She operates on approximately one tonne of wood per day, while consuming an average of 250 litres of water per day.

References

External links 
 Murray River Paddlesteamers
 PS Emmylou Cruises

Paddle steamers of Australia
1982 ships
Echuca-Moama